Hendecaneura is a genus of moths belonging to the subfamily Olethreutinae of the family Tortricidae.

Species
Hendecaneura apicipictum Walsingham, 1900
Hendecaneura axiotima (Meyrick in Caradja & Meyrick, 1937)
Hendecaneura cervinum Walsingham, 1900
Hendecaneura himalayana Nasu, 1996
Hendecaneura impar Walsingham, 1900
Hendecaneura rhododendrophaga Walsingham, 1900
Hendecaneura shawiana (Kearfott, 1907)

See also
List of Tortricidae genera

References

External links
tortricidae.com

Eucosmini
Tortricidae genera